Peter L. Strauss (born February 26, 1940) is an American lawyer, author and academic who is the Betts Professor of Law Emeritus at Columbia Law School.    

Strauss taught courses in Administrative Law, Legal Methods, and Legislation and the Regulatory State.  He is the author of several legal textbooks and has served as an attorney with the U.S Government.

Background 
After graduating Harvard College (1961) and Yale Law School (1964), Strauss spent two years clerking for federal judges in Washington, D.C. and two years lecturing on criminal law at the national university of Ethiopia.  Returning to the United States, he spent the next three years as an attorney in the Office of the Solicitor General, briefing and arguing cases before the United States Supreme Court. Strauss joined the faculty at Columbia Law School in 1971, and taught there until the fall of 2021.  During 1975-77, he became the first General Counsel of the United States Nuclear Regulatory Commission.

Publications 
Strauss's published works include Administrative Justice in the United States (1989, 2002 and 2016); Gellhorn's & Byse's Administrative Law: Cases and Comments (most recently, 2018, with Rakoff, Metzger, O'Connor and Barron); Legal Methods: Understanding and Using Cases and Statutes (2005, 2008, and 2014); Legislation, Understanding and Using Statutes (2006), Administrative Law Stories (2006) and numerous law review articles, generally focusing on issues of rule making, separation of powers, and statutory interpretation.  He also edited the English translation of the traditional Ethiopian Codex, The Fetha Nagast = The Law of the Kings (1968), translated by Abba Paulos Tzadua, later made Cardinal of the Catholic Church.

Recognitions 
In 1987 the Section of Administrative Law and Regulatory Practice of the American Bar Association presented  Strauss its third annual award for distinguished scholarship in administrative law. In 1992-93, he served as Chair of the Section. He has been reporter for rulemaking on its APA and European Union Administrative Law projects, and was a member of its E-Rulemaking task force.  In 2008, the American Constitution Society awarded Strauss the first Richard Cudahy prize for his essay "Overseer or 'The Decider'?  The President in Administrative Law."  He is a member of the American Academy of Arts and Sciences.

Strauss has visited at the European University Institute, Harvard and NYU, and lectured widely on American administrative law abroad, including programs in Argentina, Belarus, Brazil, China, Germany, Italy, Japan, the Netherlands, Mexico, Turkey and Venezuela.  During 2008-09 he was Fernand Braudel Senior Fellow at the European Law Institute and Parsons fellow at the University of Sydney Law School.
He is also a member of the board of the Law School's Public Interest Law Foundation, and a Senior Fellow of the Administrative Conference of the United States.

See also 
 List of law clerks of the Supreme Court of the United States (Seat 3)

References

1940 births
American legal scholars
Columbia Law School faculty
Fernand Braudel Fellows
Harvard University alumni
Law clerks of the Supreme Court of the United States
Living people
Yale Law School alumni